Per amore di Cesarina (For Love of Cesarina) is a 1976 Italian comedy film directed by Vittorio Sindoni.

Cast 

Walter Chiari: Davide Camporesi
Gino Bramieri: Vindice Forattini
Cinzia Monreale: Cesarina
Valeria Moriconi: Elvira Camporesi 
Roberto Chevalier: Paolino Mariani 
Deddi Savagnone: Adalgisa
Ettore Mattia

See also    
 List of Italian films of 1976

References

External links
 

1976 films
Italian comedy films
1970s Italian-language films
1976 comedy films
Films directed by Vittorio Sindoni
1970s Italian films